Fulminic acid is an acid with the formula HCNO, more specifically . It is an isomer of isocyanic acid and of its elusive tautomer, cyanic acid, and also of isofulminic acid. 

Fulminate is the anion  or any of its salts. For historical reasons, the fulminate functional group is understood to be  as in isofulminic acid; whereas the group  is called nitrile oxide.

History
This chemical was known since the early 1800s through its salts and via the products of reactions in which it was proposed to exist, but the acid itself was not detected until 1966.

Structure
Fulminic acid was long believed to have a structure of H–O–N+≡C−. It wasn't until the 1966 isolation and analysis of a pure sample of fulminic acid that this structural idea was conclusively disproven. The chemical that actually has that structure, isofulminic acid (a tautomer of the actual fulminic acid structure) was eventually detected in 1988.

The structure of the molecule has been determined by microwave spectroscopy with the following bond-lengths - C-H: 1.027(1)Å, C-N: 1.161(15)Å, N-O: 1.207(15)Å.

Synthesis
A convenient synthesis involves flash pyrolysis of certain oximes. In contrast to earlier syntheses, this method avoids the use of highly explosive metal fulminates.

References

Mineral acids
 
Hydrogen compounds